Franjo Kluz (19 September 1913 – 14 September 1944) was a Yugoslav pilot from Bosnia and a People's Hero of Yugoslavia. He is best known as one of the founders of the Partisan air force, and served as an officer in No. 352 Squadron RAF.

Early life and career 
Franjo Kluz was born in Jošik, near Bosanska Dubica. In 1931 he graduated from the Yugoslav reserve officers school as a sergeant-pilot. After the Axis invasion and establishment of Independent State of Croatia in 1941 he was drafted into the Air Force of the Independent State of Croatia and was stationed in Banja Luka.

In the second half of May 1942, like Rudi Čajavec before him, he defected to the Partisans with his Potez 25 aircraft. From the improvised airfield near Prijedor he carried out a number of sorties against Axis forces, the most notable being the attack on an Ustaša column near Orahovo on 4 June. His plane was destroyed by hostile fire on 6 July.

He then became a member of the Partisan command for Bosanska Krajina region. As a member of the command staff, he was required to be a Party member and on 14 August 1942 he was accepted as a member of the Communist Party of Yugoslavia.

On 14 October Kluz became the station commander of the First Air Base of the Yugoslav National Liberation Army (YNLA) in Livno. After the German offensive, Kluz was sent, with 200 men, to Allied-controlled Italy, where they received training, equipment and aircraft from the RAF. Kluz was commissioned as a Pilot Officer in the RAFVR, with the service number 178171.

Kluz became a member of the 1st Air Squadron of YNLA (Prva eskadrila, NOVJ), otherwise known as No. 352 Squadron RAF. On 14 September 1944, he was shot down in his Spitfire and killed by German AAA over Omiš. For his wartime service, Franjo Kluz was posthumously awarded the Order of a People's Hero of Yugoslavia.

Legacy 

His unusual distinction of being 'an officer and a gentleman' in His Britannic Majesty's Royal Air Force whilst simultaneously being a member of the proletariat's Communist Party is, in reality, unlikely to be unique, but there will certainly be very few other RAF officers who have become a national Hero, whether of Yugoslavia, or any other country.
   
A clothing factory in Belgrade was named in his honour. The company Kluz padobrani makes parachutes to this day.

A printing company in Omiš is also named after Kluz. An aero club in Zemun is also named in his honour. Streets in Skopje and in Novi Sad are also named after Kluz. The Franjo Kluz elementary school also existed in the Koševsko brdo neighbourhood of Sarajevo (since renamed Mehmed-beg Kapetanović Ljubušak elementary school).

References

1913 births
1944 deaths
People from Dubica, Bosnia and Herzegovina
Croatian World War II pilots
Croatian Home Guard personnel
Yugoslav Partisans members
Yugoslav military personnel killed in World War II
Recipients of the Order of the People's Hero
Royal Yugoslav Air Force personnel of World War II
Royal Air Force officers
Air Force of the Independent State of Croatia
Aviators killed by being shot down
Royal Air Force personnel killed in World War II